Personal narrative (PN) is a prose narrative relating personal experience usually told in first person; its content is nontraditional. "Personal" refers to a story from one's life or experiences. "Nontraditional" refers to literature that does not fit the typical criteria of a narrative.

Life stories
Charlotte Linde writes about life stories, which are similar to the personal narrative: "A life story consists of all the stories and associated discourse units, such as explanations and chronicles, and the connections between them, told by an individual during his/her lifetime that satisfy the following two criteria: The stories and associated discourse units contained in the life story have as their primary evaluation a point about the speaker, not a general point about the way the world is. The stories and the associated discourse units have extended reportability."

Linde also mentions that life story and autobiography have similarities and differences: “the primary way autobiography differs from life story is that it is a written, not oral form. More specifically it constitutes literary genre with its history, its demands, and its market.” Jeff Todd Titon also refers to personal narrative as being very similar to a life story. “A life story is, simply, a person's story of his or her life or what he or she thinks is a significant part of that life.” Titon goes on to state that personal narrative arises from conversation. According to Linda Degh, an example of personal narrative would include “any part of life history from the cradle to the grave, including great turning points to insignificant details in family life, occupation, entertainment, celebration, religion, crisis, illness, and travel, may provide material for elaboration into a narrative.”

A personal narrative can be organized by two coherence principles of life stories: causality and continuity. Causality is the relationship between cause and effect. This means that one action is the result of the other's action. Continuity is the consistent existence of something over some time.

William Labov defines personal narrative as “one verbal technique for recapitulating experience, in particular a technique of constructing narrative units which match the temporal sequence of that event.” Labov argues that narrative can be broken down into subcategories such as the abstract, orientation, complication, resolution, evaluation, and coda. The abstract is the summary of the story that usually comes at the very beginning of a story. Labov notes that the orientation (introduction) serves to orient the listener in respect to person, place, time, and behavioural situation. The orientation tells us how the story begins. An example would be “I went to the store in San Francisco.” The complication of a narrative is the conflict. A complication is key in narrative because without complication there can be no resolution. Labov writes that the complication is regularly terminated by a result.  This result is referred to as the resolution. Evaluation comes when the author reflects on the events that occurred in the story. This is common in personal narratives. Coda is another word for a conclusion. The coda concludes the evaluation and gives efficient closure to the narrative. Lastly, Labov notes that narrative is usually told in answer to some stimulus from outside.

Different approaches can be applied to personal narrative such as performance and sociolinguistic. Performance in a narrative is the execution of an action. Performance as a new and integrated approach overcomes the division of text and context resulting from more traditional approaches. When it comes to the personal narrative as a conversational interaction, Langellier thinks that personal narrative as a story text and storytelling share a concept of narrative as a separate unit of communication. Conversational interaction meaning face-to-face verbal and story text is referring to the actual written narrative. The sociolinguistic approach includes different techniques such as intensifiers, comparators, correlatives, and explicative to fully evaluate narratives. Intensifiers are used to develop one particular event.  Comparators move away from the actual event and consider what could have happened. Correlatives join two events with a single independent clause. Explicatives interrupt the narrative to go back or forth in time.

Functions 
Narrative is an elementary need of people, according to the "homo narrans" theory, and personal narrative is the "paradigm of human communication," one of the main activities performed on a daily basis. Narratives have the power to lend orderliness to unordered experiences, personal narratives reflect social organization and cultural values, and are intertwined with social evaluation of people and their actions.

At the core of personal narrative is a moral evaluation of self. The moral proposition present in all first-person narratives is, "I am a good person," or that the speaker acted wrong, and learned what was right. A key aspect of personal storytelling is the narrator must tell the story to persuade the listener that they would have acted similarly; the speaker extends their moral stance to the listener as well.

The notion that "this happened to me" is the justification of storytelling rights for all personal narrative, defence of one's actions is an integral part of this moral negotiation. More than any other topic of personal narrative, one talks more giving evidence of fairness or unfairness, drawing sympathy, approval, exoneration, understanding, or amusement from their audience.

Even some surface-level badmouthing of self can function as a reassertion of one's merit or value. The self-depreciator uses ventrilloquation (using one's voice to an enacted another) to act out or distance the speaking self from the enacted self, thus making a distinction from the self-depreciator from the self that is depreciated.

Personal narratives aren't static. Tellers change their stories for each listener, and as their relationship with that listener changes, tellers change their stories as their values change and as their understanding of their past changes.

Personal Narratives also function as a means of self-exploration. Our stories inform us who we are, who we can become, and who we cannot become. Additionally, these narratives transform who we are: narrators act when they tell, creating new selves and transforming the existing self. Not only do our memories of self shape and are in turn shaped by personal narrative, but narrators shape their narratives in order to overcome disjunction between reality and memory. Narrators authenticate their memories, in spite of the imperfect, malleable nature of memories by creating credible-sounding accounts.

One key function of personal narrative is to distinguish the self from others. Narrative is a paramount resource for forming personal identity by oneself, as well as showing and negotiating the self with others.

Conversely, we tell personal narratives to share our lives, communicate trust, and create intimacy. Personal narratives make a statement: "what you must know about me," and these stories are traded more frequently as traders grow closer, and reach milestones in the relationships. There is an obligation to trading personal narratives, an expectation of being kept in the loop that Harvey Sachs calls a symptom of "being close."

Groups can also use personal narratives to conceal an identity through collage. Family stories are accepted and held onto based on how they "shape" the group, not based on each story's individual merit or the storytelling skill.

Personal narratives also have an effect on the real world because "individuals act on what is said to them." Gillian Bennet writes about 'bereavement stories' and how personal narratives take private experience and shape it into public from in accordance with traditional attitudes and expectations.

Criticism 
Some argue that the creation and negotiation of self cannot be applied to all equally, that it is a Western-specific phenomenon. Personal narrative, according to some, belongs "within socially defined situational contexts." George Gusdorf argues that in most cultures the basic unit is the community (not the self), and one cannot be said to have a self. Charlotte Linde explains that she examines the self "in a particular culture" because different cultures see formulations of different selves because different cultures have separate examples that form a culturally safe self.

Personal narratives arise from power structures, and are therefore ideological, simultaneously producing, maintaining, and reproducing that power structure; they either support or resist the dominant meaning. Power structures have been noted as an inherent influence on personal narratives gathered and reported by ethnographers. It is argued life histories guided by questions are not personal narratives, but fall somewhere between biography and autobiography because the ethnographer helps the teller shape their story, and thus they cease to function for only the speaker.

Feminist critics have argued the theory of self is inapplicable to women and leaves women, people of color, and all marginalized groups without a self, or a deficient self. Some have noted a tendency in patriarchal societies for men's stories to be far away, as in military service, while women's stories are homebound, revolving around love, marriage, and family life.

Performance approach 
Scholars studying the performance of personal narrative (PN) are interested in the presentation of the storytelling event. This is how the study of PN is found to be both interdisciplinary and multidisciplinary requiring respect to multiple approaches of how we interpret PN. Personal narrative, in relation to storytelling, “is a way of speaking by a storyteller to an audience in a social situation—in a word, a performance". In reference to the performance of PN, Richard Bauman states that “the act of communication is put on display, objectified, lifted out to a degree from its contextual surroundings, and opened up to scrutiny by an audience.” Performance of a PN occurs in “natural speech,” that is, the ways in which the speaker uses language to convey a message. Because this language is not constant but ever-changing with the context of the PN, “no two performances are ever exactly the same”. It is impossible for a person to recount a personal experience in exactly the same way every time they perform the PN. As evident in all forms of communication, all performance is located, executed, and established as meaningful specifically within its “socially defined situational contexts” therefore the language must change with its surroundings in order to be relevant.

The intended message of performance of PN, as stated by Bauman, first “makes one communicatively accountable; it assigns to an audience the responsibility of evaluating the relative skill and effectiveness of the performer’s accomplishment.” Kristin Langellier adds that performance then, “constitutes a frame in which says metacommunication to the listeners: ‘interpret what I say in some special sense; do not take it to mean what the words alone, taken literally, would convey’.” The interaction between the teller and the audience will determine how the story is shaped and what will be told. The performance is also “keyed” by including “a range of explicit or implicit framing messages that convey instructions on how to interpret the other messages being conveyed”. The “knowledge and ability to communicate in socially appropriate and interpretable ways” through the use of framing and keying in the performance speaks to the teller's communicative competency. These modifications to the performance based on the teller's recognition of the listener's limited interpretive ability, display an effort to ensure the success of the narrative.

Once the personal narrative's message has been effectively conveyed, the narrative is completed and the teller, or performer, will signal “the end of the episodic sequence, indicating that he or she has relinquished the role of a dominant active contributor to the interaction, and is returning to the conversational mode”. Performances are thus “temporally bound, with a defined beginning and end”. These temporal boundaries also require the narrative to be told in the specific sequential order in which they occur. Gary Butler provides an example of how a teller may deliver the performance of a PN:

Well you heard… his grandfather... his... his brother had drowned... He was in the Gulf (i.e., St. Lawrence) somewhere. His wife, his wife, now, the Amedée’s grandmother, was in the woods looking for the cows one evening. Now-[Amedée] told me this story often. Well, it was... it was before my time (laughs)... Now, some nights, we used to tell all the old stories, you know?... She heard/she saw the trees and leaves mov/well, it made a racket, you know? And she said, “Bon Moses de Dieu! Who’s there?” “It’s me, Jean Buisson,” he said.... It was like that/that’s how Amedée told it to me, you know?... He said, “It’s me, Jean Buisson.” Then he said, “I want masses. I want masses said for me.” And the priest was in St. George’s in those days. She came/she came home. She told her husband. And the next morning he got dressed and walked to St. George’s to have masses said for his brother.

The performance of this PN adheres to the convention of using “natural speech.” The teller repeats words, pauses, and laughs throughout his telling of the PN. The teller frames the PN with a distinct beginning, “Well you heard…” and familiarizes the audience with the shared knowledge of how the grandfather's brother had drowned. The teller ensures continuous interaction with the audience prompted by “you know?” This holds the audience responsible for appropriate response and attentiveness to the PN. The teller follows a temporal sequence within the boundaries of the PN and provides a definitive end with “And the next morning he got dressed…” This marks the end of the teller's extended turn and allows for turn-taking to resume between the teller and the audience.

Performance approaches to the study of personal experience narratives 
Performance is a narration of experiences and life events. Folklorists now study the interaction between people while they communicate with each other. In the study of how people tell their stories, folklorists pay attention to the texture of the story which is essentially the style of the story; how it is told. Not necessarily the plot of the story, the style in which the narrator tells the story. For folklorists, performance is the act of communication, it is the telling of the story. According to Ben Gatling, performance scholars of folklore also study what goes on around the story, such as the body language that is portrayed while the narrator is telling the story, how people stand and how people move during the telling of the story. They also study how people speak, the words that they use throughout the story, this is called the ‘paratext’ says Gatling, this includes all of the ‘ums’, ‘uhs’, and ‘like’ utterances within a story that seem connect other words in a story together, creating sentences. “Performance, by contrast, is ‘natural speech’”(Bauman).

Again, Gatling states that folklorists call the different genre labels analytical categories, the genres themselves can be studied, taken apart and analyzed. For a long time, folklore was the study of genres. Folklorists studied jokes, folktales, and oral legends, but since the 60’s and 70’s, they began to shift away from the study of genres and began to study the people who tell stories. They studied the act of communication in which all of these oral and written genres were embedded. Performance approaches study the interaction between the performer and the audience. Folklorists according to Butler, have recognized the importance of the relationship between the storyteller and protagonist. Butler talks about how performance emerges into the relationship between the teller and the listener. Folklorists study what happens between the listener and the teller when a story is being narrated, how the listener responds to the narrator and how the teller acts when he or she tells their story.

According to Linde, “narrative is among the most important social resources for creating and maintaining personal identity. The narrative is a significant resource for creating our internal, private sense of self and is a major resource for conveying that self to and negotiating that self with others.” Stories about the “self” or the narrator are personal experience narratives. Since the narrative is about the self then they have the authority or the right to tell their story. In the performance approach, folklorists study the identity of the narrator. According to Bauman, there is a relationship between what is said in a narrative and the performance of the narrative. In other words, does what the narrator say come across to the audience the way that it is intended? Does the audience perceive the story the way that it is told? Bauman says that the act of communication becomes a performance and the audience is therefore responsible for evaluating the performance. According to Gatling, narrative performances become reflexive performances about the identity of the narrator and Wortham comes forward with the idea of the narrative self, Wortham says that “narrators do more than represent themselves, they also act out particular selves in telling their stories, and in doing so they transform themselves.” Depending on the audience, who the audience is and what is being said, the narrator will reconfigure oneself, or change their own identity to satisfy the audience.

There is a difference between the qualities of a performance. On one hand, the performer will admit responsibility for the narration and on the other sometimes the responsibility is omitted. It is the performer's responsibility to let the audience know before telling the story whether or not it is their story to tell or whether they would be able to tell the story well enough, this is called a hedged performance or a disclaimer of performance which is a technique that is used all of the time. It lets the audience know whether the narrator knows enough about the details to tell the story.

Keys are used within a performance narrative to tell the audience that this is a story or a joke, or for your information; they are frames of reference or “communication about communication, termed metacommunication by Gregory Bateson, giving the audience a heads up” Gatling explains that when Orson Welles began his story on the radio, people were not aware that War of the Worlds was just a story, had there been a frame of reference letting listeners know that this was just a story and not a real event, at the beginning of the radio broadcast, panic might have been prevented. According to Butler, the way a narrative is framed and the way that the audience responds to the framing ensures the success of the performance.

Socio-linguistic approach 
The socio-linguistic approach to the personal experience narrative, also called the “story-text” or “Labovian analysis”, analyzes and relates the "formal properties of the narrative to their function". This style of analysis focuses on the temporal sequencing of events, as told by the storyteller, the recurring patterns in stories, and the isolation of structural units at the clause level. Some sociolinguists follow a strict pattern of structural units for traditional storytelling, such as William Labov, while others criticize the emphasis on the structure above all else, like Anna De Fina.

Labovian model 
An example of this is Labov's Oral Narrative of Personal Experience, in which he interviewed around six hundred people throughout the United States from many different backgrounds, yet all with limited education not exceeding high school. The overall aim of this work was to correlate the social characteristics of the narrators with the structure of their narratives.

From this study, Labov constructed his structure of narratives, which can be applied to most stories: Abstract, Orientation, Complication, Evaluation, Resolution, and Coda. The abstract of narration is a brief summary of what the story is about proceeding from its beginning. The orientation is the beginning of the story in which the narrator orients or contextualizes their narrative for the listener by providing person, place, time, and situational background. The complication takes up a majority of the narrative clause and depicts a complicating element or action to the story. There can be several complicating actions in one story. The evaluation of a narrative can be defined as “the break between the complication and end result” or the point where the complication has reached its maximum. In many narratives, the evaluation is connected to the result and shows the narrator's attitude towards the narrative. The resolution of the narrative is the part of the structure that follows the evaluation and if the evaluation is the last part of the narrative, then the resolution and evaluation are the same. Some narratives have an additional element known as the coda, which is a device used to return the sequence of conversation or performance back to the present or the situation in which the storytelling event was taking place. The purpose of Labov's model was to create a temporal view of continuity in oral storytelling events.

Criticisms 
De Fina and Georgakopoulou's Narrative as Text and Structure provided a clear summary for criticisms of the "Labovian Model". The primary basis of De Fina's criticisms was the application of a model which attempted to combine "a formal syntactic characterization of narrative units with a functional definition of story constituents". The issue of coding story-texts using the Labovian Model was its strict focus on formation and structure, especially for the evaluation part of the story. Certain clauses of the story which reported speech could sometimes be classified as complicating action and could sometimes be classified as the evaluation, creating ambiguity. De Fina says that this confusion of classifying certain aspects of the story discredited the strict structural implications of certain statements as well as the clear flow of the story. Also, the ambiguity of clauses fitting into certain classifications, based on certain statements with evaluative characteristics (ones that shed light or reflected on the protagonist) create larger problems when decoding stories that are not well told or structured, and appear more chaotic and less continuous.

Later on, Labov revised his structural definition of the personal narrative after realizing his focus on temporality did not clearly separate the personal experience narrative from impersonal chronicles of past events or life stories. In his altered definition, he included the aspects of reportability and credibility. The reportability of a story is dependent on social or cultural situations but needs to be present in order for the story to be told. Basically, there needs to be a context surrounding the storytelling that supports the story itself. Credibility is another necessary step so that stories will not be challenged or accused of being false.

The final major criticism of the Labovian Model was its application to mono-logic or interview-based storytelling. The stories did not present cases of audience participation or co-construction of the story by the teller and listener(s). Labov's model, due to its basic application to mono-logic storytelling, lacks coding categories that could incorporate interactive processes to the discourse of narration.

Performance and narrative structure 
Personal narrative as conversational interaction analyzes the storytelling process that is embedded in conversation and the "stream of naturally-occurring talk". This approach heavily focuses on the ways in which storytelling events are contextualized and occur in everyday life.

The telling of a joke is an example of stories that are built into conversations that rely on the interaction between the teller and the audience. Harvey Sacks' Analysis of the Telling of Joke in Conversation provides structural units in which conversation narratives can be coded: the preface sequence, the telling sequence, and the response sequence. Sacks defines the preface sequence as an instance that can take a minimum of two-turns, a proposal or request to tell a joke or a story by the teller, and the response from the listener or audience. Depending on the content of the story or joke being told, whether it is intended to be "dirty" or inappropriate or based on personal events, the request pat of the preface will usually contain a warning or cue for a certain response (i.e. acceptance) from the recipient of the joke. Once the acceptance is given by the recipient, the telling sequence begins, in which the teller should provide the storey or joke to the recipient in its entirety. Responses from the recipient are not necessary and are usually not prompted by the teller like in the preface sequence. The final unit, the response sequence is the recipients turn for reaction to the completion of the joke or story, generally highlighted by its punchline. The response sequence is dependent on the recipient's reaction to the joke, genuine or not genuine. The gaps or silences following a punchline, in which there is no initial laughter is very contextual and telling of both the teller's ability to tell a good joke and the listener's ability to either understand the joke or decline the joke. In this way the joke is both reflexive of the teller and evaluative of the context in which the joke is told.

References

Works cited

 Bauman, Richard. "Performance." Folklore, Cultural Performances, and Popular Entertainments: A Communications-centered Handbook. New York: Oxford UP, 1992. 41-49. Print.
 Butler, Gary R. "Indexicality, Authority, and Communication in Traditional Narrative Discourse." The Journal of American Folklore 105.415 (1992): 34. Web.
 Gatling, Ben. "Personal Experience Narratives." Personal Experience Narratives Class. George Mason University, Fairfax. 31 Aug. 2015. Lecture.
 Linde, C. "Narrative and the Iconicity of the Self." Life Stories: The Creation of Coherence. New York: Oxford UP, 1993. N. pag. Print.
 Wortham, Stanton Emerson Fisher. Narratives in Action: A Strategy for Research and Analysis. New York: Teachers College, 2001. Print.

External links

Early childhood education
Narratology
Prose